Farra di Soligo is a comune (municipality) in the Province of Treviso in the Italian region Veneto, located about  northwest of Venice and about  northwest of Treviso. 

Farra di Soligo borders the following municipalities: Follina, Miane, Moriago della Battaglia, Pieve di Soligo, Sernaglia della Battaglia, Valdobbiadene, Vidor. Main sights include the small church of San Vigilio, built around 1100, and that of Santa Maria Nova, with 14th-century frescoes. The area produces the Conegliano Valdobbiadene - Prosecco wine.

References

Cities and towns in Veneto